Husarivka is a village in Izium Raion (district) in Kharkiv Oblast of Ukraine, at about  southeast by south from the centre of Kharkiv city. It belongs to Balakliia urban hromada, one of the hromadas of Ukraine.

The village came under attack by Russian forces in 2022, during the Russian invasion of Ukraine.

References

Villages in Izium Raion